Cercedilla is a municipality in the Community of Madrid, in central Spain. It is located in the Sierra de Guadarrama.

Background
 It was the hometown of Francisco Fernández Ochoa (1950–2006), an alpine ski racer known for being the first (and only) Spaniard to win a gold medal at the Winter Olympics. He won the slalom in 1972 in Japan. Less than two weeks before his death from cancer, a statue was erected in his honor in Cercedilla.

Many of his siblings were also on the national ski team; his sister Blanca won an Olympic bronze medal in 1992 in France.

Public transport

Bus

Urban lines 

 Line 1:  Funefría hospital - High School

Interurban lines 

 Line 680: Collado Villalba (hospital) - Cercedilla

 Line 684: Madrid (Moncloa) - Cercedilla (by Guadarrama)

Train 

Cercedilla has a train station which gives service to two Cercanías lines, line C-8 and C-9. Line C-8 connects Cercedilla with Madrid, Alcalá de Henares and Guadalajara, while the C-9 line has a more tourist use than commuter use, since it only has two stops, one in Navacerrada and the other in Cotos, located in the Sierra de Guadarrama. In addition, a regional train line leaves from here (although the service is provided with commuter trains) and connects the village of Cercedilla with Segovia.

See also
C-9 (Cercanías Madrid)

C-8 (Cercanías Madrid)

References 

Municipalities in the Community of Madrid